Events in the year 1991 in Mexico.

Incumbents

Federal government
 President: Carlos Salinas de Gortari
 Interior Secretary (SEGOB): Fernando Gutiérrez Barrios
 Secretary of Foreign Affairs (SRE): Fernando Solana Morales
 Communications Secretary (SCT): Andrés Caso Lombardo
 Secretary of Defense (SEDENA): Antonio Riviello Bazán
 Secretary of Navy: Luis Carlos Ruano Angulo
 Secretary of Labor and Social Welfare: Arsenio Farell Cubillas
 Secretary of Welfare: Patricio Chirinos Calero/Luis Donaldo Colosio
 Secretary of Public Education: Manuel Bartlett Díaz
 Tourism Secretary (SECTUR): Silvia Hernández Enríquez
 Secretary of the Environment (SEMARNAT): María de los Angeles Moreno/Guillermo Jiménez Morales
 Secretary of Health (SALUD): Jesús Kumate Rodríguez

Supreme Court

 President of the Supreme Court: Ulises Schmill Ordóñez

Governors

 Aguascalientes: Miguel Ángel Barberena Vega, (Institutional Revolutionary Party, PRI)
 Baja California: Ernesto Ruffo Appel, (National Action Party PAN)
 Baja California Sur: Abelardo Carrillo Zavala
 Campeche: Abelardo Carrillo Zavala/Abelardo Carrillo Zavala
 Chiapas: Patrocinio González Garrido
 Chihuahua: Fernando Baeza Meléndez
 Coahuila: Eliseo Mendoza Berrueto
 Colima: Elías Zamora Verduzco/Carlos de la Madrid Virgen
 Durango: José Ramírez Gamero
 Guanajuato: Rafael Corrales Ayala/Carlos Medina Plascencia
 Guerrero: Alejandro Cervantes Delgado
 Hidalgo: José Francisco Ruiz Massieu
 Jalisco: Adolfo Lugo Verduzco
 State of Mexico: Guillermo Cosío Vidaurri 
 Michoacán: Genovevo Figueroa Zamudio
 Morelos: Antonio Riva Palacio (PRI).
 Nayarit: Celso Humberto Delgado Ramírez
 Nuevo León: Sócrates Rizzo
 Oaxaca: Heladio Ramírez López
 Puebla: Mariano Piña Olaya
 Querétaro: Mariano Palacios Alcocer
 Quintana Roo: Miguel Borge Martín
 San Luis Potosí: Fausto Zapata
 Sinaloa: Francisco Labastida
 Sonora: Mario Morúa Johnson/Manlio Fabio Beltrones Rivera
 Tabasco: Manuel Gurría Ordóñez
 Tamaulipas: Américo Villarreal Guerra	
 Tlaxcala: Beatriz Paredes Rangel
 Veracruz: Dante Delgado Rannauro
 Yucatán: Dulce María Sauri Riancho
 Zacatecas: Genaro Borrego Estrada/Pedro de León
Regent of Mexico City: Manuel Camacho Solís

Events

 The Amparo Museum is inaugurated. 
 The FIL Award is awarded for the first time, the recipient is Chilean author Nicanor Parra. 
 The Monterrey Metro begins operating. 
 The Museo de Arte Contemporáneo de Monterrey is established.
 August 18: 1991 Mexican legislative election. 
 September 16–19: Tropical Storm Ignacio (1991).
 Unknown date: Xcaret Park opens.

Awards
Belisario Domínguez Medal of Honor – Gonzalo Aguirre Beltrán

Sport

 1990–91 Mexican Primera División season 
 1990–91 Copa México 
 Sultanes de Monterrey win the Mexican League.
 1991 Central American and Caribbean Championships in Athletics take place in Xalapa, Veracruz.
 1991 Mexican Grand Prix
 430 km of Mexico City 
 Mexico at the 1991 Pan American Games 
 The Naranjeros de Álamo are founded.

Births
 June 3 – Natasha Dupeyrón, actress and singer
 August 2 – Zuleyka Silver, fashion model and actress
 October 22 – Tatiana Martínez, actress

Deaths
 February 5 — Sergio Méndez Arceo, 7th Mexican bishop of Cuernavaca 1953-1982, and advocate of Liberation theology (b. 1907).
 June 24 — Rufino Tamayo, painter (b. 1899)
October 10 — Nazario S. Ortiz Garza, Governor of Coahuila 1929-1933

References

External links

 
Years in Mexico
Mexico